Gary J. Tunnicliffe (born 27 February 1968) is a British special make-up effects designer, writer, and director.  He has performed make-up effects in all the Hellraiser films from Hellraiser III: Hell on Earth to Hellraiser: Hellworld, wrote Hellraiser: Revelations, and wrote and directed Hellraiser: Judgment.  His other make-up credits include Candyman, Wishmaster, the Dracula 2000 series, the Pulse series, and Feast.

Career 
Tunnicliffe started out performing special make-up effects.  After collaborating with Bob Keen on make-up effects for writer-director Anthony Hickox's Waxwork II: Lost in Time (1992), he joined them again for Hickox's next project, Hellraiser III: Hell on Earth (1992).  Special effects technician Kevin Yagher, when selected to direct Hellraiser: Bloodline (1996), contacted Tunnicliffe to perform the special effects on that film.  Tunnicliffe was surprised Yagher was not performing the effects work himself, but Yagher believed Tunnicliffe's experience with the prior film would be valuable.  Tunnicliffe returned for Scott Derrickson's Hellraiser: Inferno (2000) and Rick Bota's Hellraiser: Hellseeker (2002).  He again collaborated with Bota in the next two sequels, both released in 2005.  In Hellraiser: Deader, he also directed the second unit and had a cameo appearance.  In Hellraiser: Hellworld, Tunnicliffe performed special effects, make-up effects, and collected the Hellraiser memorabilia used in the film.  Tunnicliffe appeared in the film as a Cenobite and, briefly, without make-up near the end.  In Hellraiser: Revelations (2011), he wrote the script for director Víctor Garcia.  He wrote and directed the tenth Hellraiser sequel, Judgment.

In addition to his work on the Hellraiser films, Tunnicliffe has worked with Clive Barker on Candyman (1992) and Lord of Illusions (1995).  Tunnicliffe has also worked with Patrick Lussier on several films, including the Dracula 2000 series, My Bloody Valentine 3D (2009), and Drive Angry (2011).  Other franchises include Pulse (2006) and its sequels, Mimic 2 (2001) and Mimic 3: Sentinel (2003), and Scream 4 (2011).  Besides Hellraiser: Judgment, Tunnicliffe's feature directing work includes the fairy tale films Hansel and Gretel (2002) and Jack and the Beanstalk (2009). He also directed the short films No More Souls and The Chicken Run, which are set in the Hellraiser and The Texas Chain Saw Massacre universes, respectively.

Filmography

Director 
Within the Rock (1996) 
Hansel & Gretel (2002) 
No More Souls: One Last Slice of Sensation (2004)
Hellraiser: Deader (2005, Second Unit Only)
Jack and the Beanstalk (2009)
Hellraiser: Judgment (2018)
Coulrophobia (TBA)

Writer 
Within the Rock (1996)
Guardian (2001) 
Hansel & Gretel (2002) 
Megalodon (2004) 
No More Souls: One Last Slice of Sensation (2004)
Jack and the Beanstalk (2009)
Hellraiser: Revelations (2011) 
Hellraiser: Judgment (2018)
Coulrophobia (TBA)

References

External links 
 

1968 births
People from Burntwood
English film directors
Living people
Special effects people